The Algerian Futsal Cup is a futsal competition in Algeria, pitting regional teams against each other.  It was established in 2004. The first wa won by OM Ruisseau and the second edition of 2011-12 was won by GC Mascara.

Finals

Performance by club

See also
Algerian Futsal Championship

References

Futsal competitions in Algeria